Patricia Shaw may refer to:

 Patricia Alice Shaw, Canadian linguist
 Patricia Shaw (novelist) (born 1929), Australian novelist
 Patricia Batty Shaw (1928–2004), chairwoman of the United Kingdom's National Federation of Women's Institutes
 Patty Hearst (born 1954), celebrity kidnap victim now known as Patricia Hearst Shaw